Dear Son Maruthu is a 1995 Tamil language drama film directed by M. Solai Rajendran. The film stars Rahman, Sivakumar and Soundarya, with Siva, Roopa Sree, Manorama, Nassar, Srividya, Sudha and Delhi Ganesh playing supporting roles. It was released on 21 December 1995.

Plot

The film starts with Maruthu leaving jail. Maruthu was mistakenly sent to jail by the lawyer Raani for a crime that he did not commit. Raani, who feels guilty of sending an innocent man to jail, asks for forgiveness, but Maruthu refuses her pardon and asks her to love him. Maruthu and Raani then fall in love with each other. Maruthu has a little brother named Ravi, and the two brothers run a dance class. Maruthu is a kindhearted person, whereas Ravi is a womanizer.

Maruthu then befriends Viswanathan, a popular neurosurgeon. Viswanathan lives with his wife Parvathi and brother Vijay, who is a strict police officer. Viswanathan lost his only son Ashok during the village festival many years back; after this incident, Parvathi became mentally ill. Parvathi has the habit to bring a stranger at home, thinking that he is her son Ashok.

Kaveri has a one-sided love with Ravi, but she is too shy to express it. After knowing it, Maruthu accepts her love and tells it to his brother. One day, Ravi tries to rape Kaveri at his home, but Maruthu saves her in time and severely hurts his brother in the head. Ravi then dies from a serious head injury. Viswanathan then advises Maruthu to run away.

Later, Viswanathan discovers that Ravi is his lost son Ashok. One day, Parvathi brings Maruthu at his home, thinking that he is Ashok. What transpires next forms the rest of the story.

Cast

Rahman as Maruthu
Sivakumar as Viswanathan
Soundarya as Raani, Maruthu’s lover
Siva as Ravi
Roopa Sree as Kaveri
Manorama as Kannamma
Nassar as Vijay
Srividya as Parvathi
Sudha as Meenakshi
Delhi Ganesh as Veeraiah
Jagadish
Loose Mohan as Velu
Thideer Kannaiah as Munuswamy
Ravishankar
Raja Meghnagar

Soundtrack

The film score and the soundtrack were composed by Deva. The soundtrack, released in 1995, features 6 tracks with lyrics written by Vairamuthu, Piraisoodan and Kalyanasundaram.

References

1995 films
1990s Tamil-language films
Indian drama films
Films scored by Deva (composer)